By 2017, there were at least six translations of the Tirukkural in Odia, all published after the 1970s.

History of translations
The first translation of the Kural text in Odia appeared in 1978 by Chittaranjan Das. The list of Kural translations in Odia appears in the following table.

G. N. Das's translation is based on the Hindi translation of the Tirukkural by M. G. Venkatakrishnan, and is also influenced by the English translations by P. S. Sundaram and Drew–Lazarus and Sanskrit translation by S. N. Srirama Desikan. Das retired from his IAS career in 1972, after which he took to studying saintly literatures, especially that of Kabir. In 2017, Balaram Rout made another translation, which was published by Sahitya Akademi in Delhi.

See also
 Tirukkural translations
 List of Tirukkural translations by language

References

Published Translations
 G. N. Das. (1997). Thirukkural in Oriya (Foreword by S. Sundararajan). Cuttack: Vidyapuri.

Odia
Translations into Odia